Smithville Valley Grange No. 1397, also known as First Universalist Society Church and Smithville Community Center, is a historic grange hall at Smithville Flats in Chenango County, New York. It was built in 1842 as a church and converted for use as a grange hall in 1921.  The building is in the Greek Revival style.

It was added to the National Register of Historic Places in 1998.

References

Grange organizations and buildings in New York (state)
Grange buildings on the National Register of Historic Places in New York (state)
Religious buildings and structures completed in 1842
Buildings and structures in Chenango County, New York
National Register of Historic Places in Chenango County, New York